The women's pole vault competition at the 2012 Summer Olympics in London, United Kingdom, was held at the Olympic Stadium on 4–6 August.

In the qualifying round, the 12 competitors who cleared 4.55 went into the final. Non-qualifiers included junior record holder Angelica Bengtsson, former world record holder Svetlana Feofanova and reigning world champion Fabiana Murer.

Wind and rain made conditions difficult in the final. The gold medal was won by Jennifer Suhr who cleared 4.75, silver by Yarisley Silva who also cleared 4.75, but had one more missed attempt at a lower height and bronze by two-time reigning champion Elena Isinbaeva who cleared 4.70.

Competition format
The competition consisted of two rounds, qualification and final. In qualification, each athlete had three attempts at each height and was eliminated if they failed to clear any height. Athletes who successfully jumped the qualifying height moved on the final. If fewer than 12 reached that height, the best 12 moved on. Cleared heights reset for the final, which followed the same three-attempts-per-height format until all athletes reached a height they could not jump.

Schedule
All times are British Summer Time (UTC+1)

Records
, the existing World and Olympic records were as follows.

Results

Qualifying round

Qual. rule: qualification standard 4.60m (Q) or at least best 12 qualified (q).

Final

References

Athletics at the 2012 Summer Olympics
Pole vault at the Olympics
2012 in women's athletics
Women's events at the 2012 Summer Olympics